Giannis Kalampokis (alternate spellings: Ioannis, Yiannis, Yannis, Kalambokis, Kalabokis) (Greek: Γιάννης Καλαμπόκης; born on August 15, 1978 in Ilio, Peristeri, Athens, Greece) is a Greek former professional basketball player and current basketball coach. At a height of 6'5" (1.96 m) tall, he mainly played as a swingman. He last played with AEK Athens of the Greek League.

Professional playing career

Club career
Kalampokis started his career with the Neoi Palatianis juniors team in Greece, and he then made his pro debut in 1999, while playing for Palaio Faliro in the Greek A2 League. In 2003, he made his debut in the top-tier Greek League and the EuroLeague with Olympiacos Piraeus. He then played with the Greek clubs AEK Athens and PAOK Thessaloniki.

In 2007, he signed with the Greek club Panionios. In 2009, he joined the Italian League club Treviso. After playing with Treviso, he moved back to Panionios.

In 2010, he joined the Greek club Ikaros. For the 2011–12 season, he moved back to PAOK, and he finished the season with the German League club Alba Berlin. He played with the Greek club Kolossos during the 2012–13 season, and then joined the Greek club Rethymno Aegean, for the 2013–14 season.

After spending the 2015–16 preseason with Olympiacos, Kalampokis signed with AEK Athens for the season, on October 2, 2015. He announced his retirement from playing basketball on 29 August 2016.

National team  career
Kalampokis also played with the Greece men's national basketball team at the EuroBasket 2009, where they won the bronze medal.

Coaching career
After he retired from playing professional basketball, Kalampokis became a sports commentator for basketball games on Greek TV. He then took a job coaching the youth academies of Panionios. He also worked as the President of the Greek basketball player's union. He then coached the youth academies of Peristeri.

He became an assistant coach of the Greece men's national basketball team, in November 2017.

Awards and accomplishments

As a player

Pro career
2× Greek League All-Star: (2007, 2010)

Greek senior national team
EuroBasket 2009:

References and notes

External links
Twitter
EuroLeague.net Profile
Eurobasket.com Profile
Draftexpress.com Profile 1
Draftexpress.com Profile 2
Greek Basket League Profile 
Italian League Profile 
Italian League Bio 
FCM Profile
Hellenic Federation Profile 

1978 births
Living people
AEK B.C. players
Alba Berlin players
Greek basketball coaches
Greek men's basketball players
Ikaros B.C. players
Kolossos Rodou B.C. players
Olympiacos B.C. players
Palaio Faliro B.C. players
Pallacanestro Treviso players
Panionios B.C. players
P.A.O.K. BC players
Point guards
Rethymno B.C. players
Shooting guards
Small forwards
Basketball players from Athens